Poljane pri Primskovem is a small dispersed settlement in the Primskovo area in central Slovenia. It belongs to the Municipality of Šmartno pri Litiji. The area is part of the historical region of Lower Carniola. The municipality is now included in the Central Slovenia Statistical Region.

Name
The name of the settlement was changed from Poljane pri Velikem Gabru to Poljane pri Primskovem in 1955. In the past the German name was Polane.

References

External links
Poljane pri Primskovem at Geopedia

Populated places in the Municipality of Šmartno pri Litiji